Tuapse Oil Terminal is an oil import-export terminal located  offshore the Port of Tuapse in Krasnodar Krai, Russia. It is one of the biggest oil terminals in the Black Sea that serves as a hub for crude oil deliveries to the Black Sea market. The terminal which started operations in 2005 belongs to the Russian oil giant Rosneft.
The terminal serves as a supplier for the nearby Tuapse Refinery also owned by Rosneft.

The construction of the terminal started in 2003 and was completed by 2005 at a cost of US$120 million.

See also

Rosneft

References

Oil terminals
Petroleum industry in Russia
Fuels infrastructure in Russia
Rosneft